{{Infobox election
| election_name = 2022 United States House of Representatives elections
| country = United States
| flag_year = 1960
| type = legislative
| ongoing = no
| previous_election = 2020 United States House of Representatives elections
| previous_year = 2020
| election_date = November 8, 2022
| next_election = 2024 United States House of Representatives elections
| next_year = 2024
| seats_for_election = All 435 seats in the United States House of Representatives
| majority_seats = 218
| turnout = 
| image_size = x180px
| party1 = Republican Party (US)
| image1 = File:Kevin McCarthy, official portrait, speaker (cropped2).jpg
| leader1 = Kevin McCarthy
| leader_since1 = January 3, 2019
| leaders_seat1 = 
| last_election1 = 213 seats, 47.7%
| seats_before1 = 212 
| seats1 = 222
| seat_change1 =  9
| swing1 =  2.9%
| party2 = Democratic Party (US)
| image2 = 
| leader2 = Nancy Pelosi
| leader_since2 = January 3, 2003
| leaders_seat2 = 
| last_election2 = 222 seats, 50.8%
| seats_before2 = 220 
| seats2 = 213
| seat_change2 =  9
| swing2 =  3.0%
| map_image = 
| title = Speaker
| before_election = Nancy Pelosi
| before_party = Democratic Party (US)
| after_election = Kevin McCarthy
| after_party = Republican Party (US)
| map_caption = Results  
| popular_vote1 = 54,506,136
| percentage1 = 50.6%
| popular_vote2 = 51,477,313
| percentage2 = 47.8%}}
The 2022 United States House of Representatives elections were held on November 8, 2022, as part of the 2022 United States elections during incumbent president Joe Biden's term. Representatives were elected from all 435 U.S. congressional districts across each of the 50 states to serve in the 118th United States Congress, as well as five non-voting members of the U.S. House of Representatives from the District of Columbia and four of the five inhabited insular areas. Numerous other federal, state, and local elections, including the 2022 U.S. Senate elections and the 2022 U.S. gubernatorial elections, were also held on the same date. 

The Republican Party, led by Kevin McCarthy, won control of the House, defeating Nancy Pelosi and the Democratic Party, which had held a majority in the House since 2019, as a result of the 2018 elections. Republicans also won some upsets in districts that Joe Biden won by double-digits, including . Observers attributed Democrats' surprise over-performance to, among other factors, the issue of abortion in the United States after Dobbs v. Jackson Women's Health Organization, and the underperformance of multiple statewide and congressional Republican candidates who held extreme views, including refusal to accept the party's 2020 electoral loss. On the other hand, Democrats' political prospects were weighed down by the 2021–2023 inflation surge, which Republicans blamed on President Biden and the Democratic-controlled congress. The elections marked the first time since 1875 that Democrats won all districts along the Pacific Ocean. This was the first time since 2004 that Republicans gained House seats in consecutive elections.

Gerrymandering during the 2020 U.S. redistricting cycle had a significant impact on the 2022 election results. Republicans made gains as a result of gerrymandering in Florida, Georgia, Tennessee, and Texas, while Democrats made gains as a result of gerrymandering in Illinois and New Mexico. Defensive gerrymanders helped both parties hold competitive seats in various states, while Republican gains in New York and Democratic gains in North Carolina and Ohio were made possible because their state supreme courts overturned gerrymanders passed by their state legislatures.

 Results 
As the usage of mail-in voting has increased in U.S. elections, particularly since the COVID-19 pandemic, the results in some congressional races were not known immediately following the election, which was more competitive and closer than expected, as a widely predicted red wave election did not materialize. Instead, Democrats lost fewer seats than expected at less than 10 and fewer than the average (25) for the president's party since the end of World War II. Democrats also narrowly missed a further upset for the  seat held by Republican Lauren Boebert; it was so close that it needed a recount. 

Democrats performed better than expected in states like Ohio and Pennsylvania, benefitting from a coattail effect, and performed well in Colorado and New England but suffered losses in New York. In Florida and New York, Republicans achieved state red waves, and red states became redder. Gerrymandering during the 2020 U.S. redistricting cycle gave each party advantages in various states; due to advantageous maps, Republicans performed well or made gains in Florida, Georgia, Texas, and Tennessee, and Democrats made gains in Illinois and New Mexico. As of November 10, 14 seats were flipped, with Republicans gaining 11 of them for a net gain of 8 seats; Republicans needed to maintain a net gain of at least 5 seats to regain the House. Republicans won the popular vote by a 3 percent margin and would have won it even if Democrats had contested more seats than they did, which may have cost them about 1–2 percent in the final popular vote margin. According to Harry Enten of CNN, the final popular vote margin was the second-closest midterm margin for a U.S. House election in the last 70 years.

The unprecedented degree of Republican underperformance during the election defied election analysts' predictions of heavy gains, given that while a majority of voters trusted Democrats on abortion, they were disappointed with the performance of Joe Biden and Democrats on issues facing the country, such as the economy and inflation, crime, and immigration. This has been variously attributed by political commentators to the issue of abortion after Dobbs v. Jackson Women's Health Organization overturned Roe v. Wade in June 2022; candidate quality among Republicans who held extremist or unpopular views, such as denial of the 2020 U.S. presidential election results; and youth turnout, among others. Biden described the results as a "strong night" for Democrats, and he urged for cooperation in Congress. Senator Lindsey Graham commented: "It's certainly not a red wave, that's for darn sure. But it is clear that we will take back the House." On November 9, when the results for the House were still uncertain, the Republican House leader Kevin McCarthy launched his bid to succeed long-time House Democratic leader Nancy Pelosi as Speaker of the U.S. House of Representatives. In a letter asking for support among Republicans, he wrote: "I trust you know that earning the majority is only the beginning. Now, we will be measured by what we do with our majority. Now the real work begins."

The size of the majority remained in doubt with several races still to be called more than one week after Election Day. On November 17, after Republicans were projected to win back the House, Pelosi announced that she would not seek reelection as Speaker of the House, and Hakeem Jeffries was later selected as the Democratic nominee by acclamation. On November 15, McCarthy won an internal Republican caucus poll as the party's nominee for Speaker of the House; as several members of the Republican caucus did not vote for him and had expressed opposition to his speakership, it cast doubt on how the 2023 U.S. speaker election, which began on January 3, would unfold. McCarthy's speaker bid was the first of a party leader since 1923 that did not succeed on the first ballot.

 Federal 
The 2022 election results are compared below to the 2020 election. The table does not include blank and over or under votes, both of which were included in the official results.

 Per state 

 Maps 

 Retirements 

In total, 49 representatives and one non-voting delegate (30 Democrats and 20 Republicans) retired, 17 of whom (nine Democrats and eight Republicans) sought other offices.

Democrats

: Ann Kirkpatrick retired.
: Jerry McNerney retired.
: Jackie Speier retired.
: Karen Bass retired to run for mayor of Los Angeles.
: Lucille Roybal-Allard retired.
: Alan Lowenthal retired.
: Ed Perlmutter retired.
: Stephanie Murphy retired.
: Val Demings retired to run for U.S. senator.
: Michael San Nicolas retired to run for governor of Guam.
: Kai Kahele retired to run for governor of Hawaii.
: Bobby Rush retired.
: Cheri Bustos retired.
: John Yarmuth retired.
: Anthony Brown retired to run for attorney general of Maryland.
: Brenda Lawrence retired.
: Albio Sires retired.
: Thomas Suozzi retired to run for governor of New York.
: Kathleen Rice retired.
: G. K. Butterfield retired.
: David Price retired.
: Tim Ryan retired to run for U.S. senator.
: Peter DeFazio retired.
: Conor Lamb retired to run  for U.S. senator.
: Mike Doyle retired.
: Jim Langevin retired.
: Jim Cooper retired due to redistricting.
: Eddie Bernice Johnson retired.
: Peter Welch retired to run for U.S. senator.
: Ron Kind retired.

Republicans

: Mo Brooks retired to run for U.S. senator.
: Connie Conway retired.
: Jody Hice retired to run for secretary of state of Georgia.
: Adam Kinzinger retired.
: Trey Hollingsworth retired.
: Fred Upton retired.
: Vicky Hartzler retired to run for U.S. senator.
: Billy Long retired to run for U.S. senator.
: Lee Zeldin retired to run for governor of New York.
: Joe Sempolinski retired.
: John Katko retired.
: Chris Jacobs retired.
: Ted Budd retired to run  for U.S. senator.
: Bob Gibbs retired.
: Anthony Gonzalez retired.
: Markwayne Mullin retired to run  for U.S. senator.
: Fred Keller retired.
: Louie Gohmert retired to run for attorney general of Texas.
: Van Taylor retired after admitting to an affair.
: Kevin Brady retired.

Resignations and death
Three seats were left vacant on the day of the general election due to resignations or death in 2022, two of which were not filled until the next Congress.

Democrats
Two Democrats resigned before the end of their terms.
: Charlie Crist resigned August 31 to run for governor of Florida.
: Ted Deutch resigned September 30 to become CEO of the American Jewish Committee.

Republicans
One Republican died in office.
: Jackie Walorski died August 3. A special election to fill the remainder of her term was held concurrently with the general election for the next full term.

 Incumbents defeated 
Fourteen incumbents lost renomination in the primary elections and nine incumbents lost reelection in the general elections.
 In primary elections 
 Democrats 
Six Democrats lost renomination.

 : Carolyn Bourdeaux lost a redistricting race to fellow incumbent Lucy McBath, who won the general election.
 : Marie Newman lost a redistricting race to fellow incumbent Sean Casten, who won the general election.
 : Andy Levin lost a redistricting race to fellow incumbent Haley Stevens, who won the general election.
 : Mondaire Jones sought nomination in a new district and lost to Dan Goldman, who won the general election.
 : Carolyn Maloney lost a redistricting race to fellow incumbent Jerry Nadler, who won the general election.
 : Kurt Schrader lost renomination to Jamie McLeod-Skinner, who lost the general election to Lori Chavez-DeRemer.

 Republicans 
Eight Republicans lost renomination.
 : Rodney Davis lost a redistricting race to fellow incumbent Mary Miller, who won the general election.
 : Peter Meijer lost renomination to John Gibbs, who lost the general election to Hillary Scholten.
 : Steven Palazzo lost renomination to Mike Ezell, who won the general election.
 : Madison Cawthorn lost renomination to Chuck Edwards, who won the general election.
 : Tom Rice lost renomination to Russell Fry, who won the general election.
 : Jaime Herrera Beutler lost renomination to Joe Kent (R) and Marie Gluesenkamp Perez (D) in the blanket primary, with Gluesenkamp Perez defeating Kent in the general election.
 : David McKinley lost a redistricting race to fellow incumbent Alex Mooney, who won the general election.
 : Liz Cheney lost renomination to Harriet Hageman, who won the general election.

 In general elections 
 Democrats 
 : Tom O'Halleran (first elected in 2016) lost to Eli Crane.
 : Al Lawson (first elected in 2016) lost a redistricting race to incumbent Republican Neal Dunn.
 : Cindy Axne (first elected in 2018) lost to Zach Nunn.
 : Tom Malinowski (first elected in 2018) lost to Thomas Kean Jr.
: Sean Patrick Maloney (first elected in 2012) lost to Mike Lawler.
 : Elaine Luria (first elected in 2018) lost to Jen Kiggans.

 Republicans 
 : Yvette Herrell (first elected in 2020) lost to Gabe Vasquez.
 : Steve Chabot (first elected in 1994, and then re-elected in 2010 after losing in 2008) lost to Greg Landsman.
 : Mayra Flores (first elected in 2022) lost a redistricting race to incumbent Democrat Vicente Gonzalez.

 Reapportionment

The 2020 United States census determined how many of the 435 congressional districts each state receives for the 2020 redistricting cycle. Due to population shifts, California, Illinois, Michigan, New York, Ohio, Pennsylvania, and West Virginia lost one seat. Conversely, Colorado, Florida, Montana, North Carolina, and Oregon each gained one seat; and Texas gained two seats.

New seats
Six new districts were created and two districts were restored after the 2020 redistricting process:

 
 

Seats eliminated
The following districts were eliminated and became obsolete:

Seats with multiple incumbents running
The following districts had multiple incumbent representatives running, a product of multiple districts merging in redistricting.
: Neal Dunn (R) defeated Al Lawson (D)
: Lucy McBath (D) defeated Carolyn Bourdeaux (D)
: Sean Casten (D) defeated Marie Newman (D)
: Mary Miller (R) defeated Rodney Davis (R)
: Haley Stevens (D) defeated Andy Levin (D)
: Jerry Nadler (D) defeated Carolyn Maloney (D)
: Vicente Gonzalez (D) defeated Mayra Flores (R)
: Alex Mooney (R) defeated David McKinley (R)

Open seats that changed parties

Open seats won by Democrats
: Won by Yadira Caraveo
: Won by Delia Ramirez
: Won by Nikki Budzinski
: Won by Shri Thanedar
: Won by Wiley Nickel
: Won by Jeff Jackson
: Won by Andrea Salinas
: Won by Greg Casar

Republican seats won by Democrats
: Won by Hillary Scholten
: Won by Marie Gluesenkamp Perez

Open seats won by Republicans
: Won by Kevin Kiley
: Won by John Duarte
: Won by Aaron Bean
: Won by Laurel Lee
: Won by Rich McCormick
: Won by John E. James
: Won by Ryan Zinke
: Won by Marc Molinaro
: Won by Monica De La Cruz
: Won by Wesley Hunt

Democratic seats won by Republicans
: Won by Juan Ciscomani
: Won by Cory Mills
: Won by Anna Paulina Luna
: Won by James Moylan
: Won by George Santos
: Won by Anthony D'Esposito
: Won by Lori Chavez-DeRemer
: Won by Andy Ogles
: Won by Derrick Van Orden

Open seats that parties held

Democratic holds
: Won by Kevin Mullin
: Won by Sydney Kamlager
: Won by Robert Garcia
: Won by Brittany Pettersen
: Won by Maxwell Frost
: Won by Jared Moskowitz
: Won by Jill Tokuda
: Won by Jonathan Jackson
: Won by Eric Sorensen
: Won by Morgan McGarvey
: Won by Glenn Ivey
: Won by Rob Menendez
: Won by Dan Goldman
: Won by Don Davis
: Won by Valerie Foushee
: Won by Emilia Sykes
: Won by Val Hoyle
: Won by Summer Lee
: Won by Chris Deluzio
: Won by Seth Magaziner
: Won by Jasmine Crockett
: Won by Becca Balint

Republican holds
: Won by Dale Strong
: Won by Mike Collins
: Won by Rudy Yakym, who also won the district's special election, see below
: Won by Erin Houchin
: Won by Mike Ezell
: Won by Mark Alford
: Won by Eric Burlison
: Won by Nick LaLota
: Won by Brandon Williams
: Won by Nick Langworthy
: Won by Chuck Edwards
: Won by Max Miller
: Won by Josh Brecheen
: Won by Russell Fry
: Won by Nathaniel Moran
: Won by Keith Self
: Won by Morgan Luttrell
: Won by Harriet Hageman

 Vulnerable seats 
This is a list of house seats where the winner of the 2020 presidential election and the incumbent in the district were from different parties. The results for the 2020 elections accounted for redistricting, and was representative of the new district boundaries.

 Democratic 
This is a list of districts that voted for Trump in 2020, but had a Democratic incumbent:

 Alaska at-large (Trump +10.1, Mary Peltola (D) won re-election)
 Arizona 2 (Trump +7.9, Tom O'Halleran (D) lost re-election)
 Iowa 3 (Trump +0.3, Cindy Axne (D) lost re-election)
 Maine 2 (Trump +6.1, Jared Golden (D) won re-election)
 Ohio 9 (Trump +2.9, Marcy Kaptur (D) won re-election)
 Pennsylvania 8 (Trump +2.9, Matt Cartwright (D) won re-election)

 Republican 
This is a list of districts that voted for Biden in 2020, but had a Republican incumbent:

 Arizona 1 (Biden +1.5, David Schweikert (R) won re-election)
 California 22 (Biden +12.9, David Valadao (R) won re-election)
 California 27 (Biden +12.4, Mike Garcia (R) won re-election)
 California 40 (Biden +1.9, Young Kim (R) won re-election)
 California 45 (Biden +6.2, Michelle Steel (R) won re-election)
 Nebraska 2 (Biden +6.3, Don Bacon (R) won re-election)
 New Mexico 2 (Biden +5.9, Yvette Herrell (R) lost re-election)
 Ohio 1 (Biden +8.5, Steve Chabot (R) lost re-election)
 Pennsylvania 1 (Biden +4.6, Brian Fitzpatrick (R) won re-election)
 Texas 34 (Biden +15.7, Mayra Flores (R) lost re-election)

 Closest races 
Seventy-four races were decided by 10% or lower.

 Election ratings 

In February 2022, The Guardian'' reported that "America is poised to have a staggeringly low number of competitive seats in the US House, an alarming trend that makes it harder to govern and exacerbates political polarization." The 2020 redistricting cycle resulted in 94% of the U.S. House running in relatively safe seats, often due to gerrymandering.

Special elections

There were nine special elections in 2022 to the 117th United States Congress, listed here by date and district.

|-
! 
| 
| 
| 1992
| data-sort-value=January 11, 2022  | Incumbent died April 6, 2021, of pancreatic cancer.New member elected January 11, 2022.Democratic hold.
| nowrap | 
   (Democratic) 79.0%
 Jason Mariner (Republican) 19.4%

|-
! 
| 
| 
| 2002
| data-sort-value=June 7, 2022  | Incumbent resigned January 1, 2022, to become CEO of TMTG.New member elected June 7, 2022, after no candidate received a majority vote in the April 5 jungle primary.Republican hold.
| nowrap | 

|-
! 
| 
| 
| 2012
| data-sort-value=June 14, 2022 |
Incumbent resigned March 31, 2022, to join Akin Gump.New member elected June 14, 2022.Republican gain.
| nowrap | 

|-
! 
| 
| 
| 2004
| data-sort-value=June 28, 2022 | Incumbent resigned March 31, 2022, due to criminal conviction.New member elected June 28, 2022.Republican hold. 
| nowrap | 

|-
! 
| 
| 
| 2018
| data-sort-value=August 9, 2022 | Incumbent died February 17, 2022, of kidney cancer.New member elected August 9, 2022.Republican hold.
| nowrap | 

|-
! 
| 
| 
| 1973 
| data-sort-value=August 16, 2022 | Incumbent died March 18, 2022.New member elected August 16, 2022.Democratic gain.
| nowrap | 

|-
! 
| 
| 
| 2018
| data-sort-value=August 23, 2022 | Incumbent resigned May 25, 2022, to become Lieutenant Governor of New York. New member elected August 23, 2022.Democratic hold.
| nowrap | 

|-
! 
| 
| 
| 2010 
| data-sort-value=August 23, 2022 | Incumbent resigned May 10, 2022, to join Prime Policy Group.New member elected August 23, 2022.Republican hold.
| nowrap | 

|-
! 
| 
| 
| 2012
| data-sort-value=November 8, 2022 | Incumbent died August 3, 2022, in a traffic collision.New member elected November 8, 2022.Republican hold.Winner also elected to the next term, see below.
| nowrap | 

|}

Exit polls

Alabama

Alaska

Arizona

Arkansas

California

California lost its 53rd district following the 2020 census.

Colorado

Colorado gained its 8th district following the 2020 census.

Connecticut

Delaware

Florida

Florida gained its 28th district following the 2020 census.

Georgia

Hawaii

Idaho

Illinois

Illinois lost its 18th district following the 2020 census.

Indiana

Iowa

Kansas

Kentucky

Louisiana

Maine

Maryland

Massachusetts

Michigan

Michigan lost its 14th district following the 2020 census.

Minnesota

Mississippi

Missouri

Montana

Montana regained its 2nd district following the 2020 census.

Nebraska

Nevada

New Hampshire

New Jersey

New Mexico

New York

New York lost its 27th district following the 2020 census.

North Carolina

North Carolina gained its 14th district following the 2020 census.

North Dakota

Ohio

Ohio lost its 16th district following the 2020 census.

Oklahoma

Oregon

Oregon gained its 6th district following the 2020 census.

Pennsylvania

Pennsylvania lost its 18th district following the 2020 census.

Rhode Island

South Carolina

South Dakota

Tennessee

Texas

Texas gained its 37th and 38th districts following the 2020 census.

Utah

Vermont

Virginia

Washington

West Virginia

West Virginia lost its 3rd district following the 2020 census.

Wisconsin

Wyoming

Non-voting delegates

American Samoa

|-
! 
| Amata Coleman Radewagen
| 
| 2014
| Incumbent re-elected.
| nowrap |  Amata Coleman Radewagen (Republican)
|}

District of Columbia

|-
! 
| Eleanor Holmes Norton
| 
| 1990
| Incumbent re-elected.
| nowrap | 
|}

Guam

|-
! 
| Michael San Nicolas
| 
| 2018
|  | Incumbent retired to run for governor of Guam.New member elected.Republican gain.
| nowrap | 
|}

Northern Mariana Islands

|-
! 
| Gregorio Sablan
| 
| 2008
| Incumbent re-elected.
| nowrap |  Gregorio Sablan (Democratic)
|}

United States Virgin Islands

|-
! 
| Stacey Plaskett
| 
| 2014
| Incumbent re-elected.
| nowrap |  Stacey Plaskett (Democratic)
|}

See also
2022 United States elections
2022 United States Senate elections
2022 United States gubernatorial elections
117th United States Congress
118th United States Congress

Notes

Partisan clients

References

2022